Bible translations into Gaelic may refer to:

Bible translations into Irish
Bible translations into Scottish Gaelic